Aleksandar Loma (born March 2, 1955) is a Serbian philologist, indo-europeanist and a corresponding member of the Serbian Academy of Science and Arts since October 30, 2003.

Aleksandar Loma emphasized that Serbian epic poetry about Kosovo events is older than the events it describes, having its origin in the pre-Christian and pre-Balkan periods of Serbian history.

Bibliography 

 
 Ogledna sveska, 1998, Department for etymology of Institute for Serbian language of SANU (coauthorship)
 
 Etymological dictionary of Serbian language, 2003 (coauthorship)

References

External links 
 Biography on the website of SANU
 Bibliography and short CV of Aleksandar Loma, published on SANU website

1955 births
Writers from Valjevo
Members of the Serbian Academy of Sciences and Arts
Living people